The 2007 Dubai Duty Free Men's Championship and Dubai Duty Free Women's Championship were the 15th edition of this professional tennis tournament and was played on outdoor hard courts.  The tournament was part of the International Series Gold of the 2007 ATP and the Tier II series of the 2007 WTA Tour. It took place in Dubai, United Arab Emirates from February 19 through 24 for the women, and from February 26 through March 4, 2007 for the men.

Review
The event was won by Roger Federer in men's singles, Justine Henin in women's singles, Fabrice Santoro and Nenad Zimonjić in men's doubles, and Cara Black and Liezel Huber in women's doubles.

For both Federer and Henin, it was their fourth triumph in Dubai and both hold the record for most wins here. Defending champion Rafael Nadal lost in the quarterfinals to Mikhail Youzhny, with Youzhny also defeating Nadal in the 2006 US Open quarterfinals.

Champions

Men's singles

 Roger Federer def.  Mikhail Youzhny, 6–4, 6–3

Women's singles

 Justine Henin def.  Amélie Mauresmo, 6–4, 7–5

Men's doubles

 Fabrice Santoro /  Nenad Zimonjić def.  Mahesh Bhupathi /  Radek Štěpánek, 7–5, 6–7(3–7), [10–7]

Women's doubles

 Cara Black /  Liezel Huber def.  Svetlana Kuznetsova /  Alicia Molik, 7–6(7–5), 6–4

External links
Official website
Association of Tennis Professionals (ATP) – tournament profile
WTA Profile

 
2007